CUDA (or Compute Unified Device Architecture) is a parallel computing platform and application programming interface (API) that allows software to use certain types of graphics processing units (GPUs) for general purpose processing, an approach called general-purpose computing on GPUs (GPGPU). CUDA is a software layer that gives direct access to the GPU's virtual instruction set and parallel computational elements, for the execution of compute kernels.

CUDA is designed to work with programming languages such as C, C++, and Fortran. This accessibility makes it easier for specialists in parallel programming to use GPU resources, in contrast to prior APIs like Direct3D and OpenGL, which required advanced skills in graphics programming. CUDA-powered GPUs also support programming frameworks such as OpenMP, OpenACC and OpenCL; and HIP by compiling such code to CUDA.

CUDA was created by Nvidia. When it was first introduced, the name was an acronym for Compute Unified Device Architecture, but Nvidia later dropped the common use of the acronym.

Background

The graphics processing unit (GPU), as a specialized computer processor, addresses the demands of real-time high-resolution 3D graphics compute-intensive tasks. By 2012, GPUs had evolved into highly parallel multi-core systems allowing efficient manipulation of large blocks of data. This design is more effective than general-purpose central processing unit (CPUs) for algorithms in situations where processing large blocks of data is done in parallel, such as:
 cryptographic hash functions
 machine learning
 molecular dynamics simulations
 physics engines
 sort algorithms

Programming abilities

The CUDA platform is accessible to software developers through CUDA-accelerated libraries, compiler directives such as OpenACC, and extensions to industry-standard programming languages including C, C++ and Fortran. C/C++ programmers can use 'CUDA C/C++', compiled to PTX with nvcc, Nvidia's LLVM-based C/C++ compiler, or by clang itself. Fortran programmers can use 'CUDA Fortran', compiled with the PGI CUDA Fortran compiler from The Portland Group.

In addition to libraries, compiler directives, CUDA C/C++ and CUDA Fortran, the CUDA platform supports other computational interfaces, including the Khronos Group's OpenCL, Microsoft's DirectCompute, OpenGL Compute Shader and C++ AMP. Third party wrappers are also available for Python, Perl, Fortran, Java, Ruby, Lua, Common Lisp, Haskell, R, MATLAB, IDL, Julia, and native support in Mathematica.

In the computer game industry, GPUs are used for graphics rendering, and for game physics calculations (physical effects such as debris, smoke, fire, fluids); examples include PhysX and Bullet. CUDA has also been used to accelerate non-graphical applications in computational biology, cryptography and other fields by an order of magnitude or more.

CUDA provides both a low level API (CUDA Driver API, non single-source) and a higher level API (CUDA Runtime API, single-source). The initial CUDA SDK was made public on 15 February 2007, for Microsoft Windows and Linux. Mac OS X support was later added in version 2.0, which supersedes the beta released February 14, 2008. CUDA works with all Nvidia GPUs from the G8x series onwards, including GeForce, Quadro and the Tesla line. CUDA is compatible with most standard operating systems.

CUDA 8.0 comes with the following libraries (for compilation & runtime, in alphabetical order):

 cuBLAS – CUDA Basic Linear Algebra Subroutines library
 CUDART – CUDA Runtime library
 cuFFT – CUDA Fast Fourier Transform library
 cuRAND – CUDA Random Number Generation library
 cuSOLVER – CUDA based collection of dense and sparse direct solvers
 cuSPARSE – CUDA Sparse Matrix library
 NPP – NVIDIA Performance Primitives library
 nvGRAPH – NVIDIA Graph Analytics library
 NVML – NVIDIA Management Library
 NVRTC – NVIDIA Runtime Compilation library for CUDA C++
CUDA 8.0 comes with these other software components:

 nView – NVIDIA nView Desktop Management Software
 NVWMI – NVIDIA Enterprise Management Toolkit
 GameWorks PhysX – is a multi-platform game physics engine

CUDA 9.0–9.2 comes with these other components:

 CUTLASS 1.0 – custom linear algebra algorithms, 
 NVCUVID – NVIDIA Video Decoder was deprecated in CUDA 9.2; it is now available in NVIDIA Video Codec SDK

CUDA 10 comes with these other components:

 nvJPEG – Hybrid (CPU and GPU) JPEG processing

CUDA 11.0-11.8 comes with these other components:

 CUB is new one of more supported C++ libraries
 MIG multi instance GPU support
 nvJPEG2000 – JPEG 2000 encoder and decoder

Advantages
CUDA has several advantages over traditional general-purpose computation on GPUs (GPGPU) using graphics APIs:

 Scattered reads code can read from arbitrary addresses in memory.
 Unified virtual memory (CUDA 4.0 and above)
 Unified memory (CUDA 6.0 and above)
 Shared memory CUDA exposes a fast shared memory region that can be shared among threads. This can be used as a user-managed cache, enabling higher bandwidth than is possible using texture lookups.
 Faster downloads and readbacks to and from the GPU
 Full support for integer and bitwise operations, including integer texture lookups

Limitations
 Whether for the host computer or the GPU device, all CUDA source code is now processed according to C++ syntax rules. This was not always the case. Earlier versions of CUDA were based on C syntax rules. As with the more general case of compiling C code with a C++ compiler, it is therefore possible that old C-style CUDA source code will either fail to compile or will not behave as originally intended.
 Interoperability with rendering languages such as OpenGL is one-way, with OpenGL having access to registered CUDA memory but CUDA not having access to OpenGL memory.
 Copying between host and device memory may incur a performance hit due to system bus bandwidth and latency (this can be partly alleviated with asynchronous memory transfers, handled by the GPU's DMA engine).
 Threads should be running in groups of at least 32 for best performance, with total number of threads numbering in the thousands. Branches in the program code do not affect performance significantly, provided that each of 32 threads takes the same execution path; the SIMD execution model becomes a significant limitation for any inherently divergent task (e.g. traversing a space partitioning data structure during ray tracing).
 No emulator or fallback functionality is available for modern revisions.
 Valid C++ may sometimes be flagged and prevent compilation due to the way the compiler approaches optimization for target GPU device limitations.
 C++ run-time type information (RTTI) and C++-style exception handling are only supported in host code, not in device code.
 In single-precision on first generation CUDA compute capability 1.x devices, denormal numbers are unsupported and are instead flushed to zero, and the precision of both the division and square root operations are slightly lower than IEEE 754-compliant single precision math. Devices that support compute capability 2.0 and above support denormal numbers, and the division and square root operations are IEEE 754 compliant by default. However, users can obtain the prior faster gaming-grade math of compute capability 1.x devices if desired by setting compiler flags to disable accurate divisions and accurate square roots, and enable flushing denormal numbers to zero.
 Unlike OpenCL, CUDA-enabled GPUs are only available from Nvidia. Attempts to implement CUDA on other GPUs include:
 Project Coriander: Converts CUDA C++11 source to OpenCL 1.2 C. A fork of CUDA-on-CL intended to run TensorFlow.
 CU2CL: Convert CUDA 3.2 C++ to OpenCL C.
 GPUOpen HIP: A thin abstraction layer on top of CUDA and ROCm intended for AMD and Nvidia GPUs. Has a conversion tool for importing CUDA C++ source. Supports CUDA 4.0 plus C++11 and float16.

GPUs supported
Supported CUDA Compute Capability versions for CUDA SDK version and Microarchitecture (by code name):

Note: CUDA SDK 10.2 is the last official release for macOS, as support will not be available for macOS in newer releases.

CUDA Compute Capability by version with associated GPU semiconductors and GPU card models (separated by their various application areas):

'*' – OEM-only products

Version features and specifications

Data types

Note: Any missing lines or empty entries do reflect some lack of information on that exact item.

Tensor cores

Note: Any missing lines or empty entries do reflect some lack of information on that exact item.

Technical Specification
H.1. Features and Technical Specifications – Table 14. Technical Specifications per Compute Capability

Multiprocessor Architecture

For more information read the Nvidia CUDA programming guide.

Example
This example code in C++ loads a texture from an image into an array on the GPU:

texture<float, 2, cudaReadModeElementType> tex;

void foo()
{
  cudaArray* cu_array;

  // Allocate array
  cudaChannelFormatDesc description = cudaCreateChannelDesc<float>();
  cudaMallocArray(&cu_array, &description, width, height);

  // Copy image data to array
  cudaMemcpyToArray(cu_array, image, width*height*sizeof(float), cudaMemcpyHostToDevice);

  // Set texture parameters (default)
  tex.addressMode[0] = cudaAddressModeClamp;
  tex.addressMode[1] = cudaAddressModeClamp;
  tex.filterMode = cudaFilterModePoint;
  tex.normalized = false; // do not normalize coordinates

  // Bind the array to the texture
  cudaBindTextureToArray(tex, cu_array);

  // Run kernel
  dim3 blockDim(16, 16, 1);
  dim3 gridDim((width + blockDim.x - 1)/ blockDim.x, (height + blockDim.y - 1) / blockDim.y, 1);
  kernel<<< gridDim, blockDim, 0 >>>(d_data, height, width);

  // Unbind the array from the texture
  cudaUnbindTexture(tex);
} //end foo()

__global__ void kernel(float* odata, int height, int width)
{
   unsigned int x = blockIdx.x*blockDim.x + threadIdx.x;
   unsigned int y = blockIdx.y*blockDim.y + threadIdx.y;
   if (x < width && y < height) {
      float c = tex2D(tex, x, y);
      odata[y*width+x] = c;
   }
}

Below is an example given in Python that computes the product of two arrays on the GPU. The unofficial Python language bindings can be obtained from PyCUDA.
import pycuda.compiler as comp
import pycuda.driver as drv
import numpy
import pycuda.autoinit

mod = comp.SourceModule(
    """
__global__ void multiply_them(float *dest, float *a, float *b)
{
  const int i = threadIdx.x;
  dest[i] = a[i] * b[i];
}
"""
)

multiply_them = mod.get_function("multiply_them")

a = numpy.random.randn(400).astype(numpy.float32)
b = numpy.random.randn(400).astype(numpy.float32)

dest = numpy.zeros_like(a)
multiply_them(drv.Out(dest), drv.In(a), drv.In(b), block=(400, 1, 1))

print(dest - a * b)

Additional Python bindings to simplify matrix multiplication operations can be found in the program pycublas.

 
import numpy
from pycublas import CUBLASMatrix

A = CUBLASMatrix(numpy.mat([[1, 2, 3], [4, 5, 6]], numpy.float32))
B = CUBLASMatrix(numpy.mat([[2, 3], [4, 5], [6, 7]], numpy.float32))
C = A * B
print(C.np_mat())

while CuPy directly replaces NumPy:

import cupy

a = cupy.random.randn(400)
b = cupy.random.randn(400)

dest = cupy.zeros_like(a)

print(dest - a * b)

Current and future usages of CUDA architecture
 Accelerated rendering of 3D graphics
 Accelerated interconversion of video file formats
 Accelerated encryption, decryption and compression
Bioinformatics, e.g. NGS DNA sequencing BarraCUDA
 Distributed calculations, such as predicting the native conformation of proteins
 Medical analysis simulations, for example virtual reality based on CT and MRI scan images
 Physical simulations, in particular in fluid dynamics
 Neural network training in machine learning problems
 Face recognition
 Volunteer computing projects, such as SETI@home and other projects using BOINC software
 Molecular dynamics
 Mining cryptocurrencies
 Structure from motion (SfM) software

See also
 SYCL – an open standard from Khronos Group for programming a variety of platforms, including GPUs, with single-source modern C++, similar to higher-level CUDA Runtime API (single-source)
 BrookGPU – the Stanford University graphics group's compiler
 Array programming
 Parallel computing
 Stream processing
 rCUDA – an API for computing on remote computers
 Molecular modeling on GPU
 Vulkan – low-level, high-performance 3D graphics and computing API
 OptiX – ray tracing API by NVIDIA
 CUDA binary (cubin) – a type of fat binary

References

External links
 



Computer physics engines
GPGPU
GPGPU libraries
Graphics hardware
Nvidia software
Parallel computing
Graphics cards
Video game hardware